Episcythrastis is a genus of moths of the family Pyralidae described by Edward Meyrick in 1937.

Species
Episcythrastis elaphitis Meyrick, 1937
Episcythrastis tabidella Mann, 1864
Episcythrastis tetricella Denis & Schiffermüller, 1775

Former species
The following species are mostly placed in Myelopsis, although it is sometimes treated as a synonym of Episcythrastis:
Myelopsis alatella (Hulst, 1887)
Myelopsis immundella (Hulst, 1890)
Myelopsis minutularia (Hulst, 1887)
Myelopsis subtetricella (Ragonot, 1889)

References

Phycitini
Pyralidae genera